Keokuk Community School District (KCSD) is a public school district headquartered in Keokuk, Iowa. It is entirely in Lee County, and serves Keokuk and the rural areas to the north and west of Keokuk.  The district borders the states of Illinois to the east and Missouri to the south.

 it had about 1,860 students, making it the 43rd largest school district in Iowa.

Schools
 Keokuk High School
 Keokuk Middle School
 A fire damaged the building in 2001.
 George Washington Elementary School
 Hawthorne Elementary School
 Torrence Preschool

Former schools:
 Lincoln Elementary School - Keokuk Waterworks now owns this building
 Torrence Elementary School - Now Torrence Preschool, and previously extra administrative offices
 Wells-Carey Elementary School - Built in 1925, and scheduled to close in 2012 due to reduced numbers of students.

See also
List of school districts in Iowa

References

External links
 Keokuk Community School District
School districts in Iowa
Education in Lee County, Iowa